From 1916 to 1920, the Salle Huyghens located at 6  in the 14th arrondissement of Paris, was the name given to the studio of painter Émile Lejeune (1885–1964) (former stables), which the latter put at the disposal of musicians, poets and painters friends to use as a theater and exhibition hall.

The venue was occupied by the members of Les Six: (Georges Auric, Louis Durey, Arthur Honegger, Darius Milhaud, Francis Poulenc and Germaine Tailleferre). It also gave young painters the opportunity to exhibit their first works: Georges Braque, Juan Gris, Amedeo Modigliani, and Pablo Picasso. Some evenings also included declamations by fashionable poets, such as Jean Cocteau or Blaise Cendrars.

The performances, called "Lyre et palettes" after the name of a collective named "Société lyre et palettes" created in 1916, were financed by Pierre Bertin, Blaise Cendrars, and Félix Delgrange. They welcomed a diverse public, very chic and very bohemian, like the Montparnasse district at its peak.

References

External links
 Entrancing Muse: A Documented Biography of Francis Poulenc
  Jean Cocteau, Guillaume Apollinaire, Paul Claudel et le groupe des six
 Les rendez-vous de la rue Huyghens

14th arrondissement of Paris
Entertainment venues in Paris
Les Six